The Archeparchy of Winnipeg is a Ukrainian Greek Catholic Church ecclesiastical territory or archeparchy  of the Catholic Church in Manitoba, a province of Canada. Currently, its archeparch is Lawrence Huculak.

Its cathedral is the Cathedral of Sts. Vladimir and Olga in the episcopal see of Winnipeg, Manitoba  Sts. Vladimir and Olga are the patron saints of the Cathedral.  In Ukrainian Catholic churches the patron saint of the Church is generally represented behind the altar.  Sts. Vladimir and Olga are the ones who introduced Christianity to Ukraine, and it is appropriate that the first Ukrainian Church in Winnipeg is placed under their patronage. Among the locations under the archeparchy's administration is Bishop Velychkovsky Martyr’s Shrine, also in Winnipeg.

The archeparchy oversees all Ukrainian Greek Catholic parishes in Manitoba. As of 2010, the archeparchy contained 136 parishes, 32 active diocesan priests, 11 religious priests, and 29,700 Ukrainian Greek Catholics. It also has 23 religious sisters, 11 religious brothers and 12 permanent deacons. It operates a number of parochial schools in the city of Winnipeg jointly with the Latin Archdiocese of Saint Boniface.

History 
 
Nestor Dmytriw, the first Ukrainian Greek Catholic priest in Canada, having started parishes in 1897 and 1898 in Terebowla, Manitoba, Stuartburn, Manitoba and Edna, Alberta, advocated a separate territory for Ukrainian Greek Catholics in Canada, but this idea was opposed by the existing Latin Canadian Catholic hierarchy. His vision came to fruition on 15 June 1912 when the Holy See established in Winnipeg the Apostolic Exarchate of Canada and Nykyta Budka was appointed its first Exarch (missionary bishop) for Ukrainians in Canada, in response to the success of pretend Bishop Seraphim (Stefan Ustvolsky) in organizing Ukrainians interested in the liturgical traditions of their heritage.

On 19 January 1948, it was renamed as Apostolic Exarchate of Central Canada, having lost vast territories to establish the Apostolic Exarchate of Western Canada and the Apostolic Exarchate of Eastern Canada. In 1951, it was again renamed as Apostolic Exarchate of Manitoba, having lost territory again to establish the Apostolic Exarchate of Saskatoon. On 3 November 1956, it finally lost its missionary pre-diocesan and exempt status (until then, it had been immediately subject to the Holy See) when promoted directly to metropolitan status as the Archeparchy of Winnipeg.

Ecclesiastical province 
Its ecclesiastical province in Canada includes the metropolitan's archeparchy and the following suffragan eparchies:
 Ukrainian Catholic Eparchy of Edmonton
 Ukrainian Catholic Eparchy of New Westminster
 Ukrainian Catholic Eparchy of Saskatoon
 Ukrainian Catholic Eparchy of Toronto and Eastern Canada.

Bishops

Diocesan ordinaries 
 Apostolic Exarch of Canada
 Blessed Nykyta Budka (1912.07.15 – 1927), Titular Bishop of Patara (1912.07.15 – 1949.10.01), later Auxiliary Bishop of Lviv of the Ukrainians (Ukraine) (1928 – death 1949.10.01)

 Apostolic Exarch of Central Canada
 Basil Ladyka, Basilian Order of Saint Josaphat O.S.B.M. (1929.05.20 – 1948.01.19 see below), Titular Bishop of Abydus (1929.05.20 – 1948.06.21)

 Apostolic Exarch of Manitoba
 Basil Ladyka, Basilian Order of Saint Josaphat O.S.B.M. (see above 1948.01.19 – 1956.09.01),
 Maxim Hermaniuk Redemptorist (C.SS.R.) (1956.09.01 – 1956.11.03 see below), Titular Bishop of Sinna (1951.01.13 – 1956.09.01); previously Auxiliary Exarch of Manitoba of the Ukrainians (1951.01.13 – 1955.03.13) and succeeding as former Coadjutor Apostolic Exarch of Manitoba of the Ukrainians (1955.03.13 – 1956.09.01)

 Metropolitan Archeparchs (Archbishops) of Winnipeg
 Maxim Hermaniuk, C.SS.R. (see above'' 1956.11.03 – 1992) also President of Synod of the Ukrainian Catholic Church (1969 – 1974)
 Michael Bzdel C.SS.R. (1992.12.16 – 2006.01.09)
 Lawrence Huculak, O.S.B.M. (2006.01.09 – ...), previously Eparch of Edmonton of the Ukrainians (Canada) (1996.12.16 – 2006.01.09)

Coadjutor bishop
 Maxim Hermaniuk, C.SS.R. (1955-1956)

Auxiliary bishops
 Nilus Nicholas Savaryn, O.S.B.M. (1943-1948), appointed Apostolic Exarch of Western Canada (Ukrainian)
 Andrew J. Roborecki (1948-1951), appointed Apostolic Exarch of Saskatoon (Ukrainian)
 Maxim Hermaniuk, C.SS.R. (1951-1955), appointed Coadjutor here
 Myron Michael Daciuk, O.S.B.M. (1982-1991), appointed Bishop of Edmonton (Ukrainian)
 Stefan Soroka (1996-2000), appointed Archbishop of Philadelphia (Ukrainian), USA 
 David Motiuk (2002-2007), appointed Bishop of Edmonton (Ukrainian)
 Andriy Rabiy (2022-)

Other priests of this diocese who became bishops
 Isidore Borecky, appointed Apostolic Exarch of Eastern Canada (Ukrainian) in 1948
 Roman Danylak, appointed Apostolic Administrator of Toronto (Ukrainian) in 1992

References

Sources and external links 
 Archeparchy of Winnipeg page at catholichierarchy.org retrieved July 14, 2006
 Catholic Schools Commission
 Ukrainian Catholic Archeparchy of Winnipeg
 Holy Spirit Seminary, Ottawa

Organizations based in Winnipeg
Winnipeg
Ukrainian Catholic Church in Canada
Christian organizations established in 1912
Winnipeg
Roman Catholic dioceses and prelatures established in the 20th century
Winnipeg dioceses
Ukrainian-Canadian culture in Manitoba
 
1912 establishments in Manitoba